This is the list of US arms sales to Taiwan since 1979 when the United States and the People's Republic of China established diplomatic relations. Under provisions of the Taiwan Relations Act, the US government is required to provide weapons of a defensive nature to Taiwan.

Jimmy Carter (1977-01-20 - 1981-01-20)

Ronald Reagan (1981-01-20 - 1989-01-20)

George H. W. Bush (1989-01-20 - 1993-01-20)

Bill Clinton (1993-01-20  - 2001-01-20)

George W. Bush (2001-01-20 - 2009-01-20)

Barack Obama (2009-01-20 - 2017-01-20)

Donald Trump (2017-01-20 - 2021-01-20)

Joe Biden (2021-01-20 - 2025-01-20)

References

External links
 Taiwan: Major U.S. Arms Sales Since 1990 Congressional Research Service

 

Foreign Military Sales
Weapons trade
Taiwan–United States military relations